Tom Fiebiger is a North Dakota Democratic-NPL Party politician who served as a member of the North Dakota Senate from District 45 from 2006 to 2010.

External links
North Dakota State Legislature - Senator Tom Fiebiger official ND Senate website
Project Vote Smart - Senator Tom Fiebiger (ND) profile
Follow the Money - Tom Fiebiger
2006 campaign contributions
North Dakota Democratic-NPL Party - Senator Tom Fiebiger profile

North Dakota state senators
1956 births
Living people
St. Olaf College alumni